Two Boats is a village at the foot of Green Mountain, Ascension Island, about 3 miles (4.8 km) from Wideawake Airfield. It has a population of about 120 and is residential in nature.

History
The two boats were originally placed to provide shade for Royal Marines transporting water in the 19th century.

Main sights
Two Boats is also the site of the Two Boats Club (bar and snackbar with regular live music), a large fresh water swimming pool, children's playground, and Two Boats School, the island's only school.

Gallery

See also
Green Mountain
Travellers Hill

References

External links

Populated places in Saint Helena, Ascension and Tristan da Cunha
Ascension Island
Geography of Ascension Island